Yuuna and the Haunted Hot Springs is an anime series adapted from the manga of the same title by Tadahiro Miura. It aired from July 14 to September 29, 2018, and broadcast on BS11 and Tokyo MX. The series is directed by Tsuyoshi Nagasawa at Xebec, with Hideaki Koyasu handled series composition, Kyoko Taketani designed the characters, Jin Aketagawa handled sound direction and Tomoki Kikuya composed the music. The opening theme is  performed by Luna Haruna, while the ending theme song is "Happen" performed by cast members Miyuri Shimabukuro, Eri Suzuki, and Rie Takahashi. The series is licensed in North America by Aniplex of America and simulcast on Crunchyroll. The series ran for 12 episodes. MVM Entertainment acquired the series for distribution in the UK and Ireland.

An OVA episode was bundled with the manga's 11th volume which was released on July 4, 2018. A second OVA episode was bundled with the manga's 12th volume which was released on October 4. A third OVA episode was bundled with the manga's 13th volume which was released on December 4. A two-episode OVA produced by Signal.MD was bundled with the manga's 24th volume, which was released on December 4, 2020.



Episode list

Notes

References

Yuuna and the Haunted Hot Springs